The Embassy of Slovakia in Ottawa is Slovakia's embassy in Canada. It is located at 50 Rideau Terrace, K1M 2A1, Ottawa, the Canadian capital.

The current ambassador is Vít Koziak.

There are also honorary consulates in Calgary, Montreal, Toronto and Vancouver.

External links
Embassy of Slovakia in Canada

References

Slovakia
Ottawa